Stjepan was a son of Croatian King Svetoslav Suronja, member of Trpimirović dynasty.

As his father was allied with Venetian Republic in Croatian civil wars and Croatian-Bulgarian wars, as well as in campaign of Pietro Orseolo II against Croatia in 1000, it was decided to strengthen those bonds even more.

After the coup d'état in Venice, Svetoslav Suronja and his family went to Hungary in exile and died.

Stjepan used the anarchy and made a conquest in Croatian Slavonia with Hungarians against the fratricide king. Stjepan later received the title Ban of Slavonia.

He was the father of Demetrius Zvonimir of Croatia.

References 

Medieval Croatian nobility
Bans of Croatia
11th-century Croatian people